The Midland Flat was a major greyhound racing competition held at Hall Green Stadium.

The race was inaugurated during the early 1930s and was seen as one of the principal events in the Midlands.

Post War winners

Discontinued

Venues & Distances
1945–2006 (Hall Green, 474 metres)

Sponsors
1994-1994 (Foster)
1998-1998 (Carling Black Label)
2001-2001 (William Hill)
2002-2002 (Ian Foster)
2003-2003 (Stadium Bookmakers)
2005-2005 (Ladbrokes)
2006-2006 (Net McAuleys in Spain)

References

Greyhound racing competitions in the United Kingdom
Sports competitions in Birmingham, West Midlands